Papiine alphaherpesvirus 2 (PaHV-2) is a species of virus in the genus Simplexvirus, subfamily Alphaherpesvirinae, family Herpesviridae, and order Herpesvirales.

References 

Alphaherpesvirinae